Z is a 1969 political thriller film directed by Costa-Gavras, from a screenplay he co-wrote with Jorge Semprún, adapted from the 1967 novel of the same name by Vassilis Vassilikos. The film presents a thinly-fictionalized account of the events surrounding the assassination of the democratic Greek politician Grigoris Lambrakis in 1963. With its dark view of Greek politics and its downbeat ending, the film captures the director's outrage about the junta that then ruled Greece. The title refers to a popular Greek protest slogan meaning "he lives," in reference to Lambrakis.

A French and Algerian co-production, the film stars Jean-Louis Trintignant as the investigating magistrate, an analogue of Christos Sartzetakis, who would be the Greek president from 1985 to 1990. International stars Yves Montand and Irene Papas also appear, but despite their star billing, they have very little screen time. Jacques Perrin, who also produced the film, plays a key role as a photojournalist. Other actors in the film include Pierre Dux, Charles Denner, François Périer, Georges Géret and Bernard Fresson. The musical score was composed by Mikis Theodorakis. 

Z was the first film and one of only a handful to be nominated by the Academy Awards for both Best Picture and Best Foreign Language Film. It won the latter as well as the Jury Prize at the Cannes Film Festival, the BAFTA Award for Best Film Music and the Golden Globe Award for Best Foreign Film. At the 27th Golden Globe Awards, its producers refused the award to protest the film's exclusion from the Best Motion Picture – Drama category.

Plot
The film centers on the right-wing, military-dominated government of an unnamed Mediterranean state (based on Greece). The story begins with the closing moments of a rather dull government lecture on agricultural policy until the leader of the security police takes over the podium for an impassioned speech describing the government's program to combat leftism by using the metaphors "a mildew of the mind", an infiltration of "isms" and "sunspots".

The scene shifts to preparations for a political rally of the opposition faction in which the left-leaning, pacifist deputy is to give a speech advocating nuclear disarmament. There have been attempts by the government to prevent the speech from being delivered. The venue has been changed to a much smaller hall, logistical problems have appeared out of nowhere and the people handing out leaflets about the change of venue are attacked by thugs under the command of the police. On his way to the venue, the deputy is hit on the head by one of the right-wing anticommunist protestors, some of whom are sponsored by the government, but carries on with his sharp speech. As the deputy crosses the street from the hall after giving his speech, a delivery truck speeds past him, and a man on the open truck bed strikes him down with a club. The injury eventually proves fatal, and the police manipulate witnesses to force the conclusion that the deputy was simply run over by a drunk driver.

However, the police do not control the hospital, where the autopsy disproves their interpretation. The examining magistrate, with the assistance of a photojournalist, now uncovers sufficient evidence to indict not only the two right-wing militants who committed the murder but also four high-ranking military police officers. The action of the film concludes with one of the deputy's associates rushing to see his widow to give her the surprising news of the officers' indictments. The widow looks distressed and appears not to believe things will change for the better.

An epilogue provides a synopsis of the subsequent turns of events. Instead of justice being served, the prosecutor is mysteriously removed from the case, several key witnesses die under suspicious circumstances, the assassins receive relatively short sentences, the officers receive only administrative reprimands, the deputy's close associates die or are deported and the photojournalist is sent to prison for disclosing official documents. The heads of the government resign after public disapproval, but before elections are carried out, a coup d'état occurs, and the military seize power.

Cast

Background
The 1963 murder of Greek politician and physician Grigoris Lambrakis and subsequent military junta served as the basis for the story. Among Costa-Gavras' references to the actual events was the frequency with which the military compared ideologies to diseases, seen when the General compares -isms to mildew. The Magistrate was based on real-life Greek jurist Christos Sartzetakis.  Costa-Gavras opted to show the Deputy had adulteries and conflicts with his wife to demonstrate he was simply a man.

Costa-Gavras was also motivated by the suspicious disappearance of Mehdi Ben Barka in 1965. Some American viewers infer parallels between the film and the assassination of John F. Kennedy, particularly given how some stylistic elements seem to mimic the Zapruder film. That said, Costa-Gavras has stated that the Zapruder film had not been widely circulated in Europe at the time and that Kennedy's assassination did not influence the production.

Production

Principal photography took place in Algiers at actor Jacques Perrin's suggestion, which the filmmakers approved for its Mediterranean]environment and because the Ministry of Culture was accommodating. In Algiers, the Hotel St. Georges and the central square were filming locations, while Paris' Théâtre des Champs-Élysées was used for the ballet scenes. Marcel Bozzuffi performed his own stunts wrestling on the "Kamikaze" vehicle due to the production's lack of budget for professional stunt performers.

Costa-Gavras chose Z as the title of the film based on its common occurrence in Greek graffiti for "He lives" (or even "Lambrakis you live; be our guide!" [Λαμπράκη ζεις, εσύ μας οδηγείς!; Lambráki zis, esý mas odigís!]); Costa-Gavras acknowledged a one-letter film title was unconventional and said Yves Montand expressed concern it would be confused with Zorro, but Costa-Gavras said the novelty of the idea won him over.

Soundtrack
The soundtrack by Mikis Theodorakis was a hit record. The Greek junta had placed the composer under house arrest but he was able to give his approval to Costa-Gavras for the use of existing musical pieces.

The film features, but does not credit, Pierre Henry's contemporary hit song "Psyché Rock". The soundtrack as released on LP and CD replaces Henry's song with a similar track written by Theodorakis titled "Café Rock."

 Main Title (Antonis) from the "Mauthausen Trilogy" of Mikis Theodorakis
 The Smiling Youth 
 The Chase-The Smiling Youth
 Murmur of the Heart
 Cafe Rock
 Arrival of Helen-The Smiling Youth
 Batucada
 The Smiling Youth (Bouzouki Version)
 The Smiling Youth
 Who's Not Talking About Easter
 Finale-The Smiling Youth
 Murmur of the Heart
 In This Town

"The Happy Youth" and "Who's Not Talking About Easter" were among the poems adapted from Brendan Behan's play The Hostage by Theodorakis in 1962. By referring to the Irish struggle against British rule rather than Greek realities, the poems offered a way to circumvent censorship in Greece and condemn Greece's post-war right-wing establishment. "The Smiling Youth" (το γελαστό παιδί) was also one of the nicknames of Lambrakis.

Reception
Prints of the film were acquired by the Black Panther Party and shown at underground screenings. An advance copy of the film was shown at the United Front Against Fascism conference in 1969.

It first aired on American television on The ABC Monday Night Movie in March 1974.

Critical response
At the time of release, Chicago Sun-Times film critic Roger Ebert, who named Z the best film of 1969, liked the screenplay and its message, and wrote, "[Z] is a film of our time. It is about how even moral victories are corrupted. It will make you weep and will make you angry. It will tear your guts out...When the Army junta staged its coup in 1967, the right-wing generals and the police chief were cleared of all charges and 'rehabilitated.' Those responsible for unmasking the assassination now became political criminals. These would seem to be completely political events, but the young director Costa-Gavras has told them in a style that is almost unbearably exciting. Z is at the same time a political cry of rage and a brilliant suspense thriller. It even ends in a chase: Not through the streets but through a maze of facts, alibis and official corruption."

In 2006, James Berardinelli wrote, "Z was the third feature film from Greek-born Costa-Gavras, but it is the movie that captured him to the world's attention, winning a Best Foreign Language Film Oscar. It introduced the director's signature approach of combining overt political messages with edge-of-the-seat tension." Jonathan Richards wrote in 2009, "It's hard to overstate the impact that this Oscar-winning procedural thriller had in 1969, on a world roiling in political activism, repression, and discord. In the U.S., the Vietnam War was on the front burner, the populace was passionately engaged, and the police riots outside the '68 Chicago Democratic Convention and the murder of Black Panther Fred Hampton were raw wounds. With this stylish, intense indictment of the assassination of a leftist political leader by a right wing government cabal in his native Greece, director Costa-Gavras struck a nerve that resonated here and around the globe."

On Rotten Tomatoes, the film has a 94% "fresh" score based on 47 reviews, with an average rating of 8.2/10. The site's consensus states: "Powerfully effective, this anti-fascist political thriller stands out as both high-conscience melodrama and high-tempo action movie."

The film was voted in Time'''s list of The 15 Best Political Films of All Time.

The film was selected to be screened in the Cannes Classics section of the 2015 Cannes Film Festival.

Box office
The film had a total of 3,952,913 admissions in France and was the 4th highest-grossing film of the year. It was also very popular in the United States grossing $17.3 million, being one of the top five highest-grossing non-English language films there.

 Awards and nominations Z was the second foreign-language film in Academy history to receive a nomination for Best Picture, after Grand Illusion.

 Legacy 
Filmmakers Paul Greengrass and Aki Kaurismäki listed the film in their top 10 films of all time for the 2012 Sight and Sound poll.

It is regarded as one of American filmmaker Oliver Stone's favorite films that inspired his filmmaking. John Milius also cited the film as an influence.

The American filmmaker Steven Soderbergh listed Z as an inspiration on his film Traffic and stated that he: "wanted to make it like [Costa-Gavras]'s Z".

The American filmmaker William Friedkin listed Z as one of his favorite films and mentioned the film's influence on him when directing his film The French Connection: "After I saw Z, I realized how I could shoot the French Connection. Because he [Costa-Gavras] shot 'Z' like a documentary. It was a fiction film but it was made like it was actually happening. Like the camera didn't know what was gonna happen next. And that is an induced technique. It looks like he happened upon the scene and captured what was going on as you do in a documentary. My first films were documentaries too. So I understood what he was doing but I never thought you could do that in a feature at that time until I saw Z." As an homage, Friedkin cast actor Marcel Bozzuffi in a similar role.

See also
 List of submissions to the 42nd Academy Awards for Best Foreign Language Film
 List of Algerian submissions for the Academy Award for Best Foreign Language Film
 Shanghai, a Hindi film based on Z''

References

External links
 
 
 
 
 Z background and analysis at Plaka
 Z: Sounding the Alarm an essay by Armond White at the Criterion Collection

1969 films
1960s French-language films
1960s Russian-language films
1960s English-language films
1960s crime thriller films
1960s French films
1960s in Greek politics
Algerian drama films
Best Foreign Language Film Academy Award winners
Best Foreign Language Film Golden Globe winners
Docudrama films
Edgar Award-winning works
French political thriller films
French crime thriller films
English-language French films
English-language Algerian films
Existentialist films
Films about assassinations
Films based on Greek novels
Films directed by Costa Gavras
Films set in Greece
Films shot in Algeria
Films shot in France
Films shot in Paris
Films set in 1963
Films about coups d'état
Films about political repression
Films à clef
Films scored by Mikis Theodorakis
Films about anti-fascism
Films whose editor won the Best Film Editing Academy Award
National Society of Film Critics Award for Best Film winners
Political films based on actual events